Rožnik is a small settlement in the Municipality of Grosuplje in central Slovenia. It lies east of Velike Lipljene just off the regional road leading south from Šent Jurij to Turjak. The area is part of the historical region of Lower Carniola. The municipality is now included in the Central Slovenia Statistical Region.

Gallery

References

External links

Rožnik on Geopedia

Populated places in the Municipality of Grosuplje